Bulley & Andrews, LLC is one of Chicago's oldest general contractors.
 
The firm was founded in 1891 as a partnership of Frederick Bulley, a 21-year-old English stonemason, partnered with Alfred Andrews, an architect.

Notable projects 
 Hinsdale Hospital, New Patient Pavilion, Hinsdale, IL
 Ronald McDonald House Charities, Downtown: Chicago, IL
 Radgale House, Lake Forest, IL
 Lycee Francais: Chicago, IL
 Illinois Holocaust Museum and Education Center: Skokie, IL
 S&C Electric Advanced Technology Center: Chicago, IL
 The University of Chicago Searle Chemistry Laboratory: Chicago, IL
 Jewish Reconstructionist Congregation: Evanston, IL
 DePaul University Monsignor Andrew J. McGowan Science Building: Chicago, IL
 The Richard H. Driehaus Museum: Chicago, IL Nickerson House
 Northwestern Memorial Hospital cGMP Cell Therapy Lab: Chicago, IL

References

External links
 bulley.com – website

Construction and civil engineering companies of the United States
Construction and civil engineering companies established in 1891
Companies based in Chicago
1891 establishments in Illinois